This article provides details of international football games played by the North Korea national football team from 1980 to 1999.

After a 3–0 loss to South Korea in 1993, chairman Kim Jong-il banned the national team from competing at international tournaments. They did not return to competitive football until 1998.

International matches

1980

1981

1982

1985

1986

1987

1988

1989

1990

1991

1992

1993

1998

1999

Notes

References

Football in North Korea
1980
1980s in North Korean sport
1990s in North Korean sport